The 1984 Amstel Gold Race was the 19th edition of the annual road bicycle race "Amstel Gold Race", held on Sunday April 21, 1984, in the Dutch province of Limburg. The race stretched 247 kilometres, with the start in Heerlen and the finish in Meerssen. There were a total of 144 competitors, and 55 cyclists finished the race.

Result

External links
Results

Amstel Gold Race
April 1984 sports events in Europe
1984 in road cycling
1984 in Dutch sport
1984 Super Prestige Pernod